Thomas Joseph Walsh Jr. (December 6, 1873 – June 6, 1952) was a prelate of the Roman Catholic Church.  He served as the first archbishop of the new Archdiocese of Newark in New Jersey from 1938 until his death in 1952.  

Walsh previously served as bishop of the Diocese of Newark from 1928 to 1938 and as bishop of the Diocese of Trenton in New Jersey from 1918 to 1928.

Biography

Early life 
Thomas Walsh Jr. was born in Parker's Landing, Pennsylvania, the eldest son of Thomas and Helen (Curtin) Walsh. After attending public and parochial schools in Pennsylvania, he studied at St. Bonaventure College in Allegany, New York. 

Walsh was ordained to the priesthood for the Diocese of Buffalo by Bishop James Edward Quigley on January 27, 1900. He then served as a curate at St. Joseph's Cathedral in Buffalo.  On June 25, 1900, Walsh was named chancellor of the diocese  and private secretary to Bishop Quigley.

In 1907, Bishop Charles H. Colton sent Walsh to further his studies in Rome at the Pontifical Athenaeum S. Apollinare, where he earned a doctorate in canon law (June 19, 1907) and later a doctorate in theology (June 19, 1908). Upon his return to Buffalo, Walsh resumed his duties as diocesan chancellor and secretary to the bishop. He was named rector of St. Joseph's Cathedral in 1915.

Bishop of Trenton 
On May 10, 1918, Walsh was appointed bishop of the Diocese of Trenton by Pope Benedict XV. He received his episcopal consecration on July 25, 1918 from Archbishop Giovanni Bonzano, with Bishops Dennis Dougherty and John O'Connor serving as co-consecrators. 

Walsh was among those, who with Christian Brother Barnabas McDonald encouraged the Knights of Columbus to consider working with youth. To this end, in August 1922, Walsh addressed the annual meeting of the Supreme Council of the Knights of Columbus held in Atlantic City. Supreme Knight James A. Flaherty named a special committee headed by then Deputy Supreme Knight, Martin H. Carmody to study the feasibility of organizing a junior order, which in 1925 became the Columbian Squires. 

In 1910, five sisters of the Religious Teachers Filippini were sent by Pope Pius X to work among the Italian immigrants in St. Joachim's parish in South Trenton. Walsh became a supporter of their work, and in 1918, with the help of a donation from businessman James Cox Brady, he acquired the Harvey Fisk estate "Riverside" in Ewing Township for the sisters. It became their motherhouse and novitiate. The sisters named it Villa Victoria in memory of Brady's wife, Victoria May Pery Brady. In 1933, the sisters established Villa Victoria Academy, an all-girls, private, Catholic middle and high school. He also dedicated the new St. James High School and Auditorium.

Bishop and Archbishop of Newark 
Following the death of Bishop O'Connor in May 1927, Walsh was named Bishop of the Diocese of Newark on March 2, 1928. He was installed at the, as yet unfinished, Cathedral of the Sacred Heart on May 1, 1928. The following year, Walsh established the Newark Mount Carmel Guild to help those on public assistance. In 1930, the guild set up a soup kitchen in the basement of St. Patrick's Pro-Cathedral. In 1930, Walsh acquired the "Tower Hill", the estate of Louis C. Gillespie, founder of L.C. Gillespie & Sons. He invited the Religious Teachers Filippini to expand their work to the Diocese of Newark. The sisters re-located their motherhouse to Morristown, New Jersey, and named it Villa Walsh, where they opened another girls school, Villa Walsh Academy, while continuing to operate Villa Victoria Academy in Ewing Township.

In 1931, Walsh saw the opening of a new chancery building on Mulberry St. Prior to that, the administration of the diocese was conducted out of offices at St. John's School. In 1933, Walsh established Saint Gertrude Cemetery in Colonia, New Jersey. In 1935, Walsh attended a Eucharistic congress held in Cleveland.

Walsh raised $2 million in 25 days to build Immaculate Conception Seminary in 1936, and encouraged Seton Hall Preparatory School and Seton Hall College to receive state accreditation. 

Upon the elevation of the Diocese of Newark to the rank of archdiocese by Pope Pius XI, Walsh was appointed its first archbishop on December 10, 1937. He received the pallium on April 27, 1938. He convened a synod in 1941. In September 1947, Walsh gave the opening convocation at the New Jersey Constitutional Convention. On May 3, 1950, the Government of Italy awarded Walsh the Star of Italian Solidarity for his work with Italian immigrants in the archdiocese.

Death and legacy 
Thomas Walsh died on June 6, 1952 and was buried in the Cathedral crypt.  Eighty-five prelates and 700 priests attended his funeral ceremony, with over 5,000 people outside the cathedral.

References

External links 
 Archbishop of Newark

1873 births
1952 deaths
20th-century Roman Catholic archbishops in the United States
American Roman Catholic clergy of Irish descent
Clergy from Newark, New Jersey
St. Bonaventure University alumni
Roman Catholic archbishops of Newark
Roman Catholic bishops of Trenton
Catholics from Pennsylvania